Akhyan-e Bozorg (also Romanized as Akhyān-e Bozorg) is a village in Beradust Rural District, Sumay-ye Beradust District, Urmia County, West Azerbaijan Province, Iran. At the 2006 census, its population was 65, in 12 families.

References 

Populated places in Urmia County